Maj Fletcher Eugene Adams (August 2, 1921 – May 30, 1944) was a U.S. Army Air Forces World War II flying ace who shot down nine enemy aircraft in the European theatre of World War II. Adams was murdered after being shot down.

Early life
He was married to Mary (nee) Aline and they had a son in 1944 who they named Jerry.

Career

By 1944 Adams had shot down 7 enemy aircraft.
 
But on May 30, 1944 Adams P-51B was attacked he and shot down by 4 Bf-109s near Celle Air Base: he parachuted out of his aircraft and landed on the ground. Civilians on the ground killed him. His fate was not known until after the war. After Adams surrendered to 3 Wehrmacht soldiers in Tiddische, Germany 2 German Nationals approached and took custody of him. Three men then took Adams into the woods and shot him several times. Witnesses saw the men standing over Adams' dead body after hearing gunshots. After the war, two of the men, Gustav Heidmann and Erich Schnelle, were prosecuted for murdering Adams. Heidmann was sentenced to death, while Schnelle was sentenced to 20 years in prison. However, Heidmann's sentence was reduced to life in prison, then to 20 years. He was paroled in 1954. Schnelle was released in 1950.

Awards

Congressional Gold Medal (2015)
Distinguished Flying Cross

See also
List of World War II aces from the United States
List of World War II flying aces

References

Further reading

Notes

1921 births
1944 deaths
United States Army Air Forces pilots of World War II
American World War II flying aces
Military personnel from Louisiana
United States Army Air Forces personnel killed in World War II
Recipients of the Distinguished Flying Cross (United States)
Recipients of the Silver Star
American people executed by Nazi Germany
People executed by Nazi Germany by firearm